Events from the year 1943 in Sweden

Incumbents
 Monarch – Gustaf V
 Prime Minister – Per Albin Hansson

Events

 10 March - 27 April – Norwegian Exhibition runs in Stockholm.
 October 2 – Sweden offers passports to Danish Jews fleeing Nazi aggression.
 September 23 - Trade negotiations result in Sweden repealing prior arrangements with Germany - which had allowed for the transport of German goods and troops across the country - in exchange for an increase in trade exports to Sweden from the Allied Powers.

Births

 3 January – Jarl Alfredius, journalist (died 2009).
 6 February – Pelle Svensson, wrestler, Olympic silver medalist (died 2020).
 26 February – Johnny Höglin, speed-skater, Olympic champion in 10,000 metre from 1968. 
 9 May – Anders Isaksson, journalist (died 2009).
 8 July – Anders Carlberg, politician (died 2013).
 30 November – Rolf Edling, fencer.

Exact date unknown 

 Claes Hylinger, novelist, essayist, poet and literary critic.

Deaths

 16 February – Yngve Holm, sailor (born 1895). 
 26 May – Alice Tegnér, organist and composer, (born 1864).
 14 September – Ernst Linder, general, horse rider (born 1868).

References

 
Sweden
Years of the 20th century in Sweden